The Colorado Belle is a casino hotel on the banks of the Colorado River in Laughlin, Nevada, owned and operated by Golden Entertainment. Initially closed on March 17, 2020 due to the COVID-19 pandemic, on May 18, 2020, Golden Entertainment announced that the Colorado Belle would remain closed "indefinitely," even after casinos were allowed to reopen. As of July 2022, the property remains closed.

The Colorado Belle is a fixed building made to look like a six-deck replica of a 19th-century Mississippi River paddle steamer riverboat, with 1,168 rooms in two seven-story towers. The casino had  of gaming space with 750 slot machines, and 16 table games. The hotel had three restaurants: The Loading Dock, Big Easy Deli, and Pints brewery. The resort also included two pools, a fitness room, two gift shops, a koi pond and an arcade.

History
Advanced Patent Technology, a slot machine maker and slot route operator, announced plans in 1979 to build a hotel and casino, with the hotel to be managed by Ramada. Construction began in October, as a joint venture with John Fulton, a Southern California restaurateur and the casino was opened on November 10, 1980.

In 1983, a preliminary agreement was reached to sell the casino to a group including attorney William Morris and Circus Circus Enterprises executives William Bennett and William Pennington for $1.6 million but Morris quit the deal a month later. The next year, Circus Circus bought the casino for $4 million, and made plans to move it to make room for an expansion of its neighboring Edgewater Hotel and Casino.

Plans for Colorado Belle were unveiled in 1985 and it opened on July 1, 1987, at a cost of $80 million.

Circus Circus Enterprises later became Mandalay Resort Group in 1999 and was bought by MGM Mirage in 2005.

In June 2007, MGM Mirage sold the Colorado Belle and the Edgewater to a partnership of Anthony Marnell III and Sher Gaming for a total of $200 million.

In January 2019, Golden Entertainment bought the Colorado Belle and the Edgewater from Marnell and Sher for a total of $190 million.

During the COVID-19 pandemic, the Colorado Belle was among businesses that were ordered by Nevada Governor Steve Sisolak to close on March 17, 2020, to prevent the spread of the virus. On May 18, 2020, Golden Entertainment announced that the Colorado Belle would remain closed indefinitely due to the economic impact of the business closures and uncertainty about the market. Approximately 400 employees were laid off, although some could relocate to Golden Entertainment's other properties, such as the Edgewater and Aquarius Casino Resort.

In February 2022, the general manager of Golden Entertainment’s Laughlin properties, "didn’t have an update on the status of the Colorado Belle." As of May 2022, the property remains closed. As Of February 2023, the property still remains vacated

References

External links
 
 

1980 establishments in Nevada
2020 disestablishments in Nevada
Casino hotels
Defunct casinos in Nevada
Defunct hotels in Nevada
Casinos completed in 1980
Casinos in Laughlin, Nevada
Golden Entertainment
Hotel buildings completed in 1980
Hotels established in 1980
Hotels disestablished in 2020
Hotels in Laughlin, Nevada
Mandalay Resort Group
Resorts in Laughlin, Nevada